Igram is a village and municipality in western Slovakia in Senec District in the Bratislava Region. It is located northeast of Senec, between the villages of Kaplna and Čataj. Currently, the village has around 550 inhabitants.

History
The first written reference to the town was made in 1244. Hungarian king Béla IV mentioned the village, under the name Igrech, in a document in which he  established a new church district.  The name, which is said to have been derived from "Igrici", is an old Slavic word for musicians, had gone through several changes until it stabilized at its current form as Igram.

Between 1974 and 1990 the village was part of Báhoň.

Culture and entertainment
The village has a well known folk band, called Igramčan, founded in 1923. This band serves as the cornerstone for annual folk fests called Juniáles. In 1975, Igram founded its folk dance group, still called Igramčan. Both groups perform their shows on numerous municipal festivities.

The town also features a soccer team, which has been playing in the Slovak second-lowest Fifth division soccer league for the past several years.

Demographics
As of 2004, Igram had 539 inhabitants: 259 men and 280 women  99.6% were of Slovak ethnicity, and 92.5% were Roman Catholics. 2.1% were Evangelical Catholics, and 4.9% of inhabitants were atheist.  Of the 188 houses 149 were permanently occupied.

References

External links

Official home page (in Slovak)

Villages and municipalities in Senec District